Argyle Lake State Park is an Illinois state park located in Colchester, Illinois.

The land for the state park was purchased by the state in 1948 from local farmers.  Argyle Lake, an artificial lake, was later created by damming a nearby water source.  The area now occupied by the lake was once the home of "Argyle Hollow," part of the 19th century stagecoach route between Galena and Beardstown.
The region was a source of coal, clay and limestone. While many of the brick works, clay and pottery operations have since closed, some limestone quarries in the area are still in operation today. There have been numerous Bigfoot sightings at the lake in recent years.

References

State parks of Illinois
Reservoirs in Illinois
Colchester, Illinois
Protected areas established in 1948
Protected areas of McDonough County, Illinois
Bodies of water of McDonough County, Illinois
1948 establishments in Illinois